Zambrone is a comune (municipality) in the Province of Vibo Valentia in the Italian region Calabria, located about  southwest of Catanzaro and about  northwest of Vibo Valentia.

Zambrone borders the following municipalities: Briatico, Parghelia, Zaccanopoli.

The town is home to southern Italy's first water park, Aquapark di Zambrone.

References

Cities and towns in Calabria